5-Methoxy-2,N,N-trimethyltryptamine (5-MeO-2,N,N-TMT, 5-MeO-TMT) is a psychoactive drug of the tryptamine chemical class which acts as a psychedelic. It was first synthesized by Alexander Shulgin and reported in his book TiHKAL ("Tryptamines i Have Known And Loved"). 5-MeO-TMT is claimed to show psychoactive effects at a dosage of 75–150 mg orally, but these are relatively mild compared to those of other similar compounds. This suggests that while the methyl group on the 2-position of the molecule has impaired the binding of metabolic enzymes like monoamine oxidase (MAO), it is also interfering with binding to and/or activation of the serotonin 5-HT2A receptor, the target responsible for mediating the hallucinogenic effects of such compounds.

See also 
 2,N,N-Trimethyltryptamine (2,N,N-TMT)
 5-MeO-7-TMT

References

External links 
 5-MeO-TMT Entry in TIHKAL
 5-MeO-TMT Entry in TiHKAL • info

Psychedelic tryptamines
Designer drugs